Railroad electrification in the United States began at the turn of the 20th century and comprised many different systems in many different geographical areas, few of which were connected. Despite this situation, these systems shared a small number of common reasons for electrification.

Most of the systems discussed in this article are either no longer electrified, or are now part of the Northeast Corridor and Keystone Corridor systems used by Amtrak and several commuter rail lines. A few isolated systems operate exclusively for hauling coal from mines to power plants. Most mass transit, streetcar, and interurban systems electrified very early (many from the beginning) but are not within the scope of this article.

The Association of American Railroads opposes electrification due to its high capital costs.

Impetus for electrification

Laws banning steam locomotives (smoke abatement) 
A number of municipalities passed laws in the early part of the 20th century forbidding steam locomotives from operating within city limits, after some bad accidents caused by the awful conditions of visibility in smoke and steam-filled tunnels and cuttings. The most prominent of these laws was for New York City in 1903 (effective 1908).

An extensive study was also undertaken in Chicago of the problems of smoke and the feasibility of electrification as a solution.

Long tunnels 
Long, deep tunnels provide poor ventilation for steam locomotives, to the point where crews had to wear oxygen masks to avoid asphyxiation. The ventilation problem also limited the frequency of trains through these tunnels. The Cascade Tunnel is a good example. Also see the proposed North–South Rail Link.

Mountains

The electric locomotive has many advantages in mountainous terrain, including better adhesion, greater power at low speeds, no requirements for fueling or watering, and regenerative braking. The planned California High-Speed Rail system, for example requires electrification to achieve acceptable speeds through the Tehachapi Mountains.

Traffic density

Extremely high-traffic lines can readily recoup the high capital investment of electrification by the savings accrued during operation. The savings typically result from improved utilization of trains, and lower maintenance costs.

Short-distance commuter operations

Suburban commuter trains are an ideal subject for electrification since electric multiple units possess rapid acceleration, fast braking (sometimes regenerative braking) and the ability to change direction without running a locomotive around. It also reduces diesel locomotive emissions in relatively high-density areas.

Freight operations
Heavy freight trains are ideally suited to electric traction due to the greater pulling power of an electric locomotive.

Overview of electrification in the U.S. 

In 2013 the only electrified lines hauling freight by electricity were three short line coal haulers (mine to power plant) and one switching railroad in Iowa. While some freight trains run on parts of the electrified Northeast Corridor and on part of the adjacent Keystone Corridor, these freight trains use diesel locomotives for traction. Diesel-powered freight runs similarly operate over the South Shore Line and the San Diego Trolley light rail system.

Current systems

Several additional heritage railways operate electric excursions on former main lines, including the East Troy Electric Railroad ( of tracks) and Western Railway Museum ( of tracks).

History of electrification projects in the United States

Smoke abatement

Cleveland Union Terminals Co. 

In June 1929 this railroad switched from steam to electric operation on a  route between Collinwood and Linndale in Ohio. A  overhead system was used. This change of operation was for smoke abatement. Electric operation ceased in 1953.

New York Central Railroad (Hudson and Harlem Divisions) 

The New York Central electrified a section of its main line Hudson Division route in 1913 from New York City (Grand Central Terminal) to Harmon (now Croton-Harmon), where it changed to at first steam, then diesel power. The Harlem Division in Westchester County, New York was also electrified to North White Plains. Metro-North Railroad, the successor to New York Central's commuter operations, continues to use these lines, and extended the Harlem Line electrification to Southeast in 1984.

The Hudson Line is used by Amtrak for intercity passenger service to and via Albany, but these trains run to Penn Station via the Empire Connector, and only in the underground area in and near that station do Amtrak's dual-mode (diesel and electric) locomotives shift to using the overrunning DC third rail.

Tunnels

Baltimore and Ohio Railroad 

The construction of the Howard Street tunnel through Baltimore in order to make a rail connection to New York City brought about the world's first mainline electrification. Operation began in 1895 with three General Electric locomotives. These locomotives only worked pulling northbound trains; southbound traffic simply coasted through this section, which was all downhill. Initially the system used a unique overhead track in which the current shoe rode, but shortly after it was converted to a conventional  third rail system. The electrification was discontinued in 1952 when dieselization made it unnecessary.

Boston & Maine Railroad (Hoosac Tunnel) 

The Hoosac Tunnel was electrified by the Boston & Maine Railroad in May 1911. This was done to speed up trains and to reduce smoke in the tunnel. Electricity was provided from the Zylonite power plant in Adams, MA. The electrification was switched off in August 1946 with the arrival of diesel locomotives on the route.

Grand Trunk Railway (St. Clair Tunnel) 

The St. Clair Tunnel is the name for two separate rail tunnels which were built under the St. Clair River between Sarnia, Ontario and Port Huron, Michigan. It was the first full-size (i.e. able to allow a railroad to run through it) subaqueous tunnel built in North America.

Steam locomotives were used in the early years to pull trains through the tunnel, however concerns about the potential dangers of suffocation should a train stall in the tunnel led to the installation of catenary wires for electric-powered locomotives by 1907. The first use of electric locomotives through the tunnel in regular service occurred on May 17, 1908.

The electric-powered locomotives were retired in 1958 and scrapped in 1959 after CNR retired and scrapped its last steam-powered locomotives on trains passing through the tunnel. New diesel-powered locomotives did not cause the same problems with air quality in this relatively short tunnel.

Great Northern Railway (Cascade Tunnel) 

The Great Northern Railway (now BNSF Railway) electrified the  original Cascade Tunnel in 1909, near the summit of Stevens Pass in the Cascade Mountains. This first electrification system with GE-built boxcabs were the only three-phase AC power ever used on North America railroads, see Three-phase AC railway electrification. The electric boxcabs pulled trains through the tunnel with their steam locomotives still attached until they were retired in 1927.

In 1925 work began on the new  Cascade Tunnel, with the Great Northern ultimately electrifying a  section of its main line route to Seattle, Washington from Wenatchee to Skykomish. Electric locomotives handled mainline freight and passenger trains on this section exclusively. The route was de-energized and catenary dismantled in 1956, after the Cascade Tunnel was fitted with ventilation fans.

Michigan Central Railroad (Detroit Tunnel Lines) 

The Michigan Central Railroad electrified the tunnels under the Detroit river in 1910. The system used a  under-running third rail.

The electrification was discontinued in the early 1950s when the tunnel was ventilated so that diesels could run through.

Mountainous Terrain

Butte, Anaconda and Pacific Railway 

The BA&P, a copper ore-hauling short line in Montana, electrified in 1913 using a  system engineered by General Electric. It was the first primarily freight railroad in North America to electrify. Original motive power was in the form of 28 identical B-B boxcabs, which served until de-electrification in 1967, by which time diesel-electric locomotives were cheaper to run. GE used the BA&P as a model railroad for demonstrating the success of its DC electrification techniques.

Chicago, Milwaukee and St. Paul Railroad (the Milwaukee Road) 

The Chicago, Milwaukee and St. Paul Railroad ('Pacific' was not added to the title until incorporation in 1927) electrified two of its mountainous divisions using a DC overhead system.  The two divisions were widely separated from each other, but plans to electrify the intervening , the relatively flat Idaho Division from Avery to Othello, were never implemented.

The higher voltage was chosen because of the load conditions with 2,500 ton trains.

Rocky Mountain Division (Harlowton to Avery) 
The electrification remained in operation until 1974, when diesel locomotives took over.  There were two main reasons for electrifying this division.  The first was to get through the Bitter Root Mountains, which are steeply graded.  The second was that the line passes through an important forest reserve of the US Government. Steam trains were a fire hazard, and thus electric trains lessened the risk.

Coast Division (Othello to Tacoma/Seattle) 

Norfolk and Western Railway 

Virginian Railway 

It went to the N&W with the 1959 merger and was de-electrified in 1962.

Traffic Density

Amtrak 

Amtrak, the national intercity passenger railroad, inherited a 1930s-era 11 kV  electrification system from the Pennsylvania Railroad (PRR), which it is slowly modernizing, and has completed two electrification projects on its own lines.

A short portion of the Empire Connection was electrified when it was built in 1991, allowing trains from Albany direct access to Penn Station New York by use of dual-mode locomotives. Track near the terminal was electrified with  third rail, compatible with the third rail system used within Penn Station by the Long Island Rail Road (LIRR).

The Northeast Corridor mainline from New Haven to Boston was electrified in 1999, completing the thwarted ambition of the former New York, New Haven and Hartford Railroad.

Boston, Revere Beach and Lynn Railroad 

This railroad changed from steam to electric operation in 1928 using a  overhead system. The company filed for bankruptcy in 1937, and ceased operating in 1940. In 1952 a section of the line between East Boston and Revere was bought by the MBTA and is now a part of the Blue Line. The remainder of the line to Lynn is owned by the Commonwealth of Massachusetts and may be used for further expansion of the Blue Line.

Erie Railroad (Rochester Division) 

In June 1907, the Erie Railroad changed from steam to electric operation on its Rochester Division. The system lasted in operation until 1934.

New York, New Haven and Hartford Railroad 

The New York, New Haven and Hartford Railroad completed electrification in 1907 of its New Haven–New York City mainline and was one of the pioneers of heavy electric railway use in the United States. The New Haven chose the  system, later used by the PRR, in addition to working with Westinghouse to develop AC/DC electric motors (locomotives) to run on both AC overhead lines and DC third rail.

Pennsylvania Railroad 

The Pennsylvania Railroad carried out many electrification projects.

West Jersey and Seashore Railroad 

A third-rail system was used for most of the line except overhead trolley wire was installed between Mickle Street in Camden and Gloucester City as well as a  segment between Newfield and Millville. The Camden-Gloucester City portion was installed due to a decision to use the old Camden Seventh Street line as part of the route. Numerous grade crossings on both this segment and in Gloucester City precluded the use of third rail due to public safety considerations. The Millville branch, however, was equipped with overhead wire as a "method of comparing the durability of trolley wire versus third rail under high-speed open-country operating conditions." The WJ&S ordered 62 coaches and six combination baggage mail units split between Jackson and Sharp Company, and J. G. Brill and Company at Philadelphia, which had 46 cars from the order. Brill sublet work on 22 coaches to its Wason subsidiary in Springfield, Massachusetts.

The electrification was opened in 1906 with cars that resembled wooden interurbans of other electric traction properties. The same year the 1906 Atlantic City train wreck occurred, in which a three-car train of the new equipment derailed and fell into a waterway; 53 people died. Other cars were built in 1909 bringing the fleet total to 80 MP1 and MP2 class wooden MU coaches. The 19 purchased in 1909 had steel instead of wooden ends and featured PRR porthole style windows on each end. There were six MO1 class passenger-baggage combines including two with steel ends, four MBM1 baggage-mail cars and two MB1 baggage-express cars. In 1912, the PRR assigned two MPB54 all-steel combines and 15 all-steel MP54 coaches to WJ&S. WJ&S and the Reading subsidiary Atlantic City Railroad were merged into Pennsylvania-Reading Seashore Lines (P-RSL) in 1932.

Electric MU service between Newfield and Atlantic City ended Sept. 26, 1931 so P-RSL only inherited the electrified Millville commuter rail service from WJ&S. On Oct. 20, 1948, New Jersey's public utility regulators ordered P-RSL to remove all remaining 26 wooden MU coaches from service as a safety hazard should they be involved in fire or collision. P-RSL management already was considering replacing the MUs due to an aging power distribution system and obsolete rolling stock. So nearly two-thirds of the MU fleet was removed from service. With only the PRR style all-steel MUs left for passenger service, P-RSL cut back the electrified commuter service to Glassboro, New Jersey in fall 1948 and management then ordered an end to all remaining electrification as of Sept. 8, 1949. On that date a morning commuter run from Glassboro to Camden ended 43 years of electrification. Non-electrified commuter rail service to Glassboro and Millville continued until March 5, 1971.

New York Terminal 
Electrification was installed from Sunnyside Yard in Queens, through New York Penn Station to Manhattan Transfer station in New Jersey. A  third rail (Top Contact) system was used. Electrification was later changed to  overhead catenary, when the PRR electrified its mainline to Washington, D. C. in the early 1930s. Third rail is still installed in the East River Tunnels in order to provide power the LIRR trains. Third rail is also installed in the North River Tunnels for use in emergencies should power be lost to the overhead catenary.

Paoli 
A section of the Chicago-Philadelphia Main Line (now part of Amtrak's Keystone Corridor) was electrified in 1915. The suburban service runs between the former Broad Street Station in Philadelphia and the village of Paoli. It was expanded in 1919 on the PRR's Chestnut Hill line, and in the 1920s on the Philadelphia-Washington, D.C. main line between Philadelphia and Wilmington, and on the West Chester Line between Philadelphia and West Chester, with the latter two lines being fed through a single substation located in Chester.

New York - Washington 
Extensive electrification after 1925 occurred on the PRR's New York-Washington line (now part of the Northeast Corridor), the Chicago-Philadelphia Main Line between Paoli and Harrisburg, several major commuter lines in Pennsylvania and New Jersey, and on major low-grade, through-freight lines, including the Trenton Cutoff, the Atglen & Susquehanna, Port Road, Philadelphia & Thorndale, Shellpot, and Enola branches. All electrification done after 1919 used the same catenary supports used on the Paoli commuter line, but with the catenary being supplied with  "transmission" lines with the voltage stepped-down at substations located every . The PPL-owned Safe Harbor Dam, located near the Exelon-owned Peach Bottom Nuclear Power Plant between Conowingo, Maryland and York, Pennsylvania, supplies the power for all post-1925 electrical expansion projects, while Exelon supplies the pre-1925 electrification areas through the existing Philadelphia, Ardmore, and Chester substations. Plans were made in the thirties to extend electrification to Pittsburgh, but were not pursued due to the Great Depression.

Since its takeover by Amtrak in 1976, both the Northeast and Keystone Corridors are undergoing extensive wire replacements, either by Amtrak or SEPTA, while the through-freight branches taken over by Conrail have been de-electrified and freight operations carried out by diesel locomotives. Those lines that were de-electrified, but have transmission lines are maintained by Amtrak through arrangements through Conrail's successors, Norfolk Southern and CSX Transportation.

Rock Island & Southern Railway 

This railroad electrified  between Rock Island and Monmouth, Illinois using an  system.

Spokane & Inland Empire Railroad 

In 1906, this railroad electrified from Spokane to Colfax, Washington and Moscow, Idaho using a  system.

Suburban Commuter Operations

Boston, Revere Beach and Lynn 

From 1928 to its abandonment in 1940, the narrow-gauge Boston, Revere Beach and Lynn Railroad was operated with overhead electrification. The railroad shut down in 1940, and portions of it were used for the MBTA Blue Line which opened in 1953, although it used an entirely new electrification system and is operated as part of a subway system.

Caltrain 

The Caltrain Modernization Program (CalMod) is a $1.9 billion project that will electrify the railroad's main line, which serves cities in the San Francisco Peninsula and Silicon Valley. Caltrain service has existed almost unchanged in its current form since it was operated as the Peninsula Commute by the Southern Pacific Railroad in the late 19th century, but proposals for electrifying the line began as early as 1992. The project lay dormant due to lack of funding until Caltrain agreed to share its tracks with the California High-Speed Rail Authority. CalMod will electrify  of tracks between 4th and King station and Tamien Station and plans to be completed by 2024.

Delaware, Lackawanna and Western Railroad / Morris and Essex Railroad 

Denver RTD 

Lines emanate from Denver Union Station and run to Denver International Airport, Westminster, and Wheat Ridge, and Thornton.

Illinois Central Railroad 

The Illinois Central Railroad electrified its three commuter lines serving Chicago in 1926 pursuant to ordinances passed by the city. The IC commuter lines remain electrified and are now operated as Metra Electric. Two tracks are unelectrified and used for freight and Amtrak service to downstate Illinois and beyond.

Long Island Rail Road 

The Long Island Rail Road's electrification was initiated in the first decade of the 20th century while it was owned by the Pennsylvania Railroad, which was building tunnels under the Hudson River and East River to gain access to Manhattan. The first segment of the LIRR to be electrified was the trackage between the Atlantic Avenue terminal in Brooklyn and Jamaica station. Electrification extended east of Jamaica to the Belmont Park station in 1905. In 1910, the opening of Pennsylvania Station (New York City) ushered in electric service between that station and Jamaica. The LIRR's Port Washington Branch was rebuilt and electrified by 1918. By 1934, LIRR branches to Mineola, Hempstead, West Hempstead, Far Rockaway, Long Beach, and Babylon were electrified. In 1970, electrification was extended to Hicksville, and to Huntington on the Port Jefferson Branch. In 1987, electrification of the Main Line between Hicksville and Ronkonkoma was completed, resulting in greatly increased service.

The LIRR utilizes third rail electrification, which was the original method used by the PRR. By the 1930s, the PRR had switched to overhead catenary electrification, but the LIRR has continued utilizing its third rail system.

New York, Westchester and Boston Railway 

This railroad operation its suburban train service with electric service. From Mount Vernon the line split into two 2-track lines; one to New Rochelle, NY and a second to White Plains, NY.

Reading Railroad 

Electrification on the Reading Railroad began during the late 1920s. The first stage was placed in operation on July 26, 1931, when electric suburban trains began serving the Bethlehem Branch between Reading Terminal, Philadelphia and Lansdale, the Doylestown Branch between Lansdale and Doylestown, the New Hope Branch between Glenside and Hatboro, and the Jersey City Branch between Jenkintown and West Trenton, New Jersey. The second stage, the Norristown and Chestnut Hill branches, was opened on February 5, 1933.

Extensions of electrification over intercity lines, such as West Trenton-Jersey City, Norristown-Reading-Harrisburg, and Lansdale-Bethlehem were planned, but because of the Great Depression, they were dropped. Only two expansion projects, carried out by the Reading with funding from SEPTA, were that of the Newtown Branch between Newtown Junction and Fox Chase in September 1966, and the Warminster Branch between Hatboro and Warminster in 1974.

Since the takeover of the Reading commuter lines in 1983, SEPTA has rehabilitated the catenary wires between the Center City Commuter Connection and Wayne Junction, and on all ex-Reading tracks owned by SEPTA. Those sections of ex-Reading tracks owned by Conrail, and later by CSX, are being done on a step-by-step basis.

Providence, Warren and Bristol Railroad 

The Providence, Warren and Bristol Railroad between Providence, Rhode Island and Fall River, Massachusetts was electrified between 1900 and 1934, during which time it was part of the New York, New Haven and Hartford Railroad. After several derailments operating over street trackage in Providence, a tunnel was built to connect the railroad to Providence Union Station. The line has since been abandoned and much of it is used for the East Bay Bike Path.

South Shore Line 

Northern Indiana Commuter Transportation District operates electric service along the South Shore Line, which runs from South Bend, Indiana to Chicago, partly via the Metra Electric line. Commuter trains are fully electrified via  overhead line. Freight operations along the line utilize diesel locomotion.

Freight operations

Texas Transportation Company 

The Texas transportation Company operated a small Class III railroad in San Antonio until 2001, mostly serving the Pearl Brewery. It had a connection to the Southern Pacific Railroad, and briefly hosted passenger service in the 1980s with a former San Antonio trolley.

Black Mesa and Lake Powell Railroad 

The BM&LP was an isolated short line in Arizona which hauled coal from a mine near Kayenta to the Navajo Generating Station power plant at Page. When built in 1973, it was the first line to use  overhead catenary. The line did not connect to any other part of the American rail network. Operations on the line ceased on August 26, 2019.

Muskingum Electric Railroad 

This line operated between a coal mine and power generation station in southeast Ohio. It was electrified its entire life from its construction in 1968 to its dismantling around 2004. The line utilized 50,000 volt AC catenary to power GE E50C locomotives.

Mason City & Clear Lake Traction Co. 

This is a  line in Iowa that was built to connect Mason City with Clear Lake. Initially it operated a passenger service using a 600 V overhead system. In 1961 it was sold to investors and renamed as Iowa Terminal. In 1987 the line was purchased once more and was renamed to Iowa Traction Railway (IATR) where it now operates as a freight only railway.

Deseret-Western Railway 

The Deseret Power Railroad , formerly known as the Deseret-Western Railway, is an isolated short line between Colorado and Utah which hauls coal from Deserado Mine to Bonanza Power Plant. It was built in 1983 and opened on January 4, 1984. Electrification is at 50 kv AC overhead wire. The line does not connect to the national rail network.

Navajo Mine Railroad 

The Navajo Mine Railroad  operates between the Four Corners Generating Station and BHP's Navajo Coal Mine in New Mexico. The line started operation in 1974 using diesel locomotives and was electrified in 1984 because diesel operation was too expensive with the increasing train loads, fuel prices and problems with clogged oil bath filters on the diesel locomotives due to the excessive coal dust. Electrification is at  overhead line. The railroad does not have any connection to the rest of the American rail network.

Martin Lake Line 

The Martin Lake Line, owned by Luminant, once operated an electrified coal hauling line operating between mines in Beckville to the Martin Lake Power Plant in Texas. The railroad operated GE E25Bs and GE E60s, but electrification was dismantled and dieselized in the early 2010s.

Testing
The Transportation Technology Center in Pueblo, Colorado maintains a test track  in length. Acela trains are tested at this site.

See also 
 Rail transportation in the United States
 List of railway electrification systems

References 

United States